A string quintet is a musical composition for five string players. As an extension to the string quartet (two violins, a viola, and a cello), a string quintet includes a fifth string instrument, usually a second viola (a so-called "viola quintet") or a second cello (a "cello quintet"), or occasionally a double bass.

Notable examples of classic "viola quintets", in four movement form include those of Wolfgang Amadeus Mozart. Other examples were written by composers including Johannes Brahms and Felix Mendelssohn.

A famous "cello quintet" is Franz Schubert's Quintet in C major. Antonín Dvořák's Quintet Op. 77 uses a double bass, and Mozart's famous Eine kleine Nachtmusik may be performed with this instrumentation (the double bass being optional).

Alternative additions include clarinet or piano (see clarinet quintet, piano quintet); and other closely related chamber music genres include the string quartet (much more common), the string trio, and the string sextet. A more unusual form of string quintet is the violin quintet composed of 3 violins, a viola and a cello (thus a string quartet with an additional violin).

The term string quintet may refer to a group of five players that performs such works. The ensemble was standard in 17th century Italy and can be seen as early as 1607 in Claudio Monteverdi's opera, L'Orfeo.

List of viola quintets
Johann Georg Albrechtsberger – 19 String Quintets called "Sonatas" (1782-1803)
Franz Joseph Aumann – String Quintet "Divertimento" in C major (c.1760)
Arnold Bax – Quintet (1933)
Frank Bridge – Quintet in E minor (H15, 1901)
Ludwig van Beethoven – Quintet, Op. 29, sometimes called the Storm Quintet; a Fugue in D major for viola quintet, Op. 137; an arrangement of his Octet for Viola Quintet, Op. 4 (the original Octet was later published as Op.103); an arrangement of his Piano Trio Op. 1 No. 3 for Viola Quintet, Op. 104
Luigi Boccherini – twelve original Quintets, arrangements of all twelve of his Piano Quintets (Op.56 and Op.57) for Viola Quintet.
Johannes Brahms – two Quintets, Op. 88 and Op. 111; the Clarinet Quintet Op. 115 may be performed with a viola substituting for the clarinet
Max Bruch –  Quintet in A minor
Anton Bruckner – String Quintet in F major (1879); Intermezzo in D minor (substitute for the scherzo)
Carson Cooman – Quintet (Unquiet Parables, 2009), Op 856
Brett Dean – Epitaph for string quintet (2010)
Antonín Dvořák – two Quintets, No. 1 in A minor and No. 3 in E (the American Quintet)
Victor Ewald – a Quintet Op. 4 in A major
Eduard Franck – two Quintets, Op. 15 in E minor and Op. 51 in C Major
Florian Leopold Gassmann – Op. 2 six String Quintets H 501–506 (1772)
Friedrich Gernsheim – Quintet Op. 9 in D
Roy Harris – Quintet (1940)
Franz Joseph Haydn – Hob.II:2 Divertimento in G major (c.1754)
Heinrich von Herzogenberg – Quintet in C minor, Op.77 (1892)
Franz Anton Hoffmeister Op. 2 six Quintets (c.1782)
Klaus Huber – Ecce homines (1998)
Heinrich Kaminski – Quintet in F minor (two versions, first 1916)
Franz Krommer – fifteen String Quintets
 six String Quintets in F,G,B,A,E♭,C major
Bohuslav Martinů –  Quintet (1927)
Felix Mendelssohn – two Quintets: No. 1 in A major, Op. 18 (1826, revised 1832) and No. 2 in B-flat major, Op.87 (1845)
Ernst Mielck – Quintet in F major (1897)
Darius Milhaud – Quintet Op. 325 (1953–1954)
Wolfgang Amadeus Mozart – six Quintets: K174, K406/516b, K515, K516, K593, K614
Carl Nielsen – Quintet in G major (1888)
George Onslow – five out of his thirty-four Quintets are with two violas; four are with double bass and the rest with two cellos (see below)
Hubert Parry – Quintet in E flat (1909) 
George Perle – Quintet (1958)
Josef Rheinberger –  Quintet in A minor, Op. 82 (1874) (Carus-Verlag)
Ferdinand Ries – Seven Quintets, Op. 37 in C, Op. 68 in D minor, Op. 167 in A minor, Op. 171 in G, Op. 183 in E-flat, and two published without opus in A major and F minor (published in a series "Samtliche Streichquintette" edited by Jürgen Schmidt between 2003-5 for Accolade Musikverlag.)
Franz Schubert – "Quintet-Overture" for  Quintet, D 8
Roger Sessions –  Quintet (1958)
Robert Simpson – Quintet (1987)
Louis Spohr – seven  Quintets
Charles Villiers Stanford – Two  Quintets, Op. 85 & Op.86  
Johan Svendsen – Quintet in C, Op. 5 (1868)
Sergei Taneyev – Quintet in C, Op. 16
Johann Baptist Wanhal – Six String Quintets (1774)
Ralph Vaughan Williams – Quintet (the Phantasy Quintet – 1912) and Nocturne and Scherzo (1904-1906)
Felix Weingartner –  Quintet, his Op. 40 
Ermanno Wolf-Ferrari - Quintet in C, Op. 24 (1939)
John Woolrich – The Death of King Renaud (1991)
Alexander von Zemlinsky – Quintet (1894–1896): 2 movements are lost

List of cello quintets

Arnold Bax –  Quintet in G major (1908), the second movement of which was rescored by the composer for Viola Quintet and published as the Lyrical Interlude (1923);
Wilhelm Berger – Quintet in E minor, Op. 75 (1911)
Luigi Boccherini – one hundred and ten Quintets. The third movement Minuet of the Cello Quintet Op.11 No.5 is extremely well known.
Alexander Borodin – Quintet in F minor (1859–1860)
Luigi Cherubini – Quintet in E minor (1837)
Felix Otto Dessoff –  Quintet, Op. 10
Friedrich Dotzauer –  Quintet in D minor, Op. 134 (1835)
Felix Draeseke –  Quintet in F, Op. 77 (1901)
Friedrich Gernsheim –  Quintet Op. 89 in E
Alexander Glazunov –  Quintet in A, Op. 39 (1892)
Karl Goldmark –  Quintet in A minor, Op. 9 (1862)
Theodore Gouvy –  Quintet in G, op 55 is on IMSLP 
August Klughardt – Quintet in G minor, Op. 62 (1902)
Frank Martin – Pavane couleur du temps (Colour of weather Pavane), 1920, 7', For  quintet.
Darius Milhaud –  Quintet Op. 350 (1956)
George Onslow – twenty-five of his thirty-four string quintets are Cello Quintets; five are with two violas and four are with double bass
Einojuhani Rautavaara – Quintet "Les Cieux Inconnues" (Unknown Heavens, 1997)
Ottorino Respighi –  Quintet in G minor (1901, incomplete)
Wolfgang Rihm – Epilog (2013)
George Rochberg – Quintet for Two Violins, Viola and Two Cellos (1982)
Franz Schubert – Cello Quintet, Op. post. 163, D 956
Peter Seabourne – Quintet for Two Violins, Viola and Two Cellos (2012)
Robert Simpson – Quintet (1995)
Ethel Smyth – Quintet in E major, Op. 1
Sergei Taneyev – Quintet in G, Op. 14 (1900–1901)
Ferdinand Thieriot – Streich-Quintett G-Dur, 1914; others with wind instruments
Carl Vine – String Quintet (2009)

String quintets for 3 violins, viola and cello
Johann Georg Albrechtsberger, String Quintet (1798)
Franz Clement, Introduction and Polonaise in E major (Polonaise für die Violine mit Begleitung von 2 Violinen, Viola und Violonzello)
Heinrich Wilhelm Ernst, Polonaise, Op.17
Morton Feldman, Violin and String Quartet (1985)

Charles Martin Loeffler – one Violin Quintet (three violins, viola and cello)
Joseph Mayseder, Polonaise No.1, Op.10; Polonaise No.3, Op.12

Alessandro Rolla, Divertimento for Violin and String Quartet, BI 429
Franz Schubert, Rondo in A major for Violin and Strings, D 438
Louis Spohr, Potpourri No.2 in B major (Potpourri on themes by Mozart for violin and string quartet (with bass ad libitum))

List of double bass quintets
Leslie Bassett – Quintet (1957)
Luigi Boccherini – three Quintets.
Antonín Dvořák – Quintet Op. 77 in G (1875)
Brian Ferneyhough – Christus Resurgens (2017)
Alistair Hinton – String Quintet (1969–77)
Vagn Holmboe –  Quintet, Op. 165/M.326 (1986)
Darius Milhaud – Quintet Op. 316
Wolfgang Amadeus Mozart - Serenade No. 13, K. 525, "Eine kleine Nachtmusik"
George Onslow – four out of his thirty-four String Quintets are with double bass; five with two violas and the rest with two cellos
Robert Paterson – I See You (2015) (for string quintet with double bass and recording)

String quintets for other combinations

Felix Draeseke – one Quintet in A for Two Violins, Viola, Violotta, and Cello (the Stelzner-Quintett; 1897); Draeseke also composed one Cello Quintet- in F, Op. 77 (1901)

Works making use of a string quintet
Nigel Keay – one Double Bass Quintet with Contralto, Tango Suite (2002)

See also
 String quintet repertoire

References

Chamber music
Types of musical groups
Musical quintets